or Ono Jiroemon Tadaaki was a Japanese samurai of the early Edo period, who was renowned as a swordsman. He founded the Ono-ha Ittō-ryū style of swordsmanship after his teacher made him head master of the Ittō-ryū. He was one of two official sword masters for Tokugawa Ieyasu and his style, along with Yagyū Shinkage-ryū became one of the official ryūha of the Tokugawa Shogunate.

Tenzen (典膳), meaning assistant cupbearer (for the Emperor) seems to have been a court title under Ritsuryō system, Tadaaki got as an honorific from the Bakufu.

In Eiji Yoshikawa's book Musashi, Tadaaki appears as an aging samurai, instructor to the Shogun. He faces Sasaki Kojiro and gives up when realizing that he is now too old to fight people as skilled as Kojiro. He then withdraws from public life and goes to live as an hermit.

References

Kendo: Elements, Rules and Philosophy Copyright(c) Jinichi Tokeshi

Further reading

 
 

Samurai
Japanese swordfighters
People from Chiba Prefecture